Illusive is the adjective form of illusory.

Illusive may also refer to:

 Illusive Islands, Nunavut, Canada
 Illusive Sounds, an independent Australian hip hop record label
 Illusive Tracks, a Swedish dark comedy thriller film
 Snowflake/Illusive, a 7" vinyl picture disc single by Psychic TV
 USS Illusive (AM-448), minesweeper ship
 Illusive (album)

See also
 Illusion